The 1950 Rivière-du-Loup B-50 nuclear weapon loss incident refers to loss of a nuclear weapon near Rivière-du-Loup, Quebec, Canada, during the fall of 1950. The bomb was released due to engine troubles, and then was destroyed in a non-nuclear detonation before it hit the ground.

Background
The plutonium core ("pit"), which is the key component for a nuclear reaction and detonation, was not installed in the bomb at the time. The absence of the core probably was because of its high cost and relative scarcity at the time.
Standard US Air Force protocol prohibited any aircraft carrying a nuclear device to land with the device if the aircraft was experiencing engine problems — it had to be jettisoned. Per standard protocol, the plutonium trigger was always removed prior to flight and shipped separately to prevent accidental nuclear activation. 
At the time of the incident, the aircraft was returning from CFB Goose Bay to Davis–Monthan Air Force Base. The troubled aircraft successfully diverted to Loring Air Force Base in Maine.

The incident was immediately covered up at the time, and explained away as  military practice bombs being detonated. It was not until the 1980s that the Air Force confirmed it had been a nuclear incident.

See also
List of military nuclear accidents

References

Rivière-du-Loup
Riviere du loup
Riviere du loup
Riviere du loup
Riviere du loup
Riviere du loup
Riviere du loup
Riviere du loup
Canada–United States military relations
Riviere du loup
1950 disasters in Canada
November 1950 events in Canada